Rumen Petkov (26 January 1948 – 10 June 2018) was a Bulgarian animator, painter and comic creator. He is best remembered for his animated series Choko the Stork and Boko the Frog, which he also adapted into a comic strip. His influence spawned a new generation of young Bulgarian comics artists, such as Vladimir Nedialkov, Koko Sarkisian, Ivan Kirjakov, Sten Damyanov, and others.

Career
Petkov was one of the main artists of the comics magazine Duga ("Rainbow"), which was the most popular comics magazine for several generations of Bulgarian children. His series The Adventures of Choko the Stork and Boko the Frog was popular in Bulgaria during the 1970s and 1980s. Other famous animated films he directed are Friends of Gosho the Elephant, Treasure Planet, etc. He won the Grand Prize at the Ottawa Animation Festival and the Palme d'Or for Best Short at the 1985 Cannes Film Festival.

In the 1990s, Petkov worked as a writer, storyboard artist, animation director and director on some episodes of Johnny Bravo, Dexter's Laboratory, Cow and Chicken, I Am Weasel, The New Woody Woodpecker Show and other series. He said about animation: "Animation will never die because it's like music, because it's like running with the wind, because it's funny."

Work

Theatrical animated films
 Treasure Planet (1982) (not to be confused with Disney's 2002 film)

Comics
 The Adventures of Choko the Stork and Boko the Frog

Animated television specials
 It's Flashbeagle, Charlie Brown (1984)--additional animator
 Happy New Year, Charlie Brown! (1986)--animator
 Snoopy: The Musical (1988)--animator
 Why, Charlie Brown, Why? (1990)--animator
 You're in the Super Bowl, Charlie Brown (1994)--animator
 It Was My Best Birthday Ever, Charlie Brown (1997)--animator
 Grandma Got Run Over by a Reindeer (2000)--sheet timer
 Tom and Jerry Blast Off to Mars! (2005)--animation and timing director
 Hey Arnold: The Jungle Movie! (2017)--animation director

Animated television series
 Aaahh!!! Real Monsters (1994-1997)
 Dexter's Laboratory (1996-2003)
 Duckman (1994-1997)
 Johnny Bravo (1997-2004)
 Cow and Chicken (1997-1999)
 I Am Weasel (1997-2000)
 Mike, Lu and Og (1999-2000)
 The New Woody Woodpecker Show (1999-2002)

References

External links
 

1948 births
2018 deaths
Bulgarian animators
Bulgarian comics artists
Bulgarian emigrants to the United States
Bulgarian animated film directors
Bulgarian film directors
Bulgarian television directors
Bulgarian painters
Storyboard artists
Art directors
Artists from Sofia